Unicorn Peak is the highest point in the Tatoosh Range which is a sub-range of the Cascade Range. It's located in Mount Rainier National Park, south of Mount Rainier. The descriptive name is for the mountain's resemblance to the head and horn of a unicorn. The toponym was officially adopted in 1913 by the U.S. Board on Geographic Names. Precipitation runoff from the mountain's small glaciers, such as Unicorn Glacier, drains into tributaries of the Cowlitz River.

Climate
Unicorn Peak is located in the marine west coast climate zone of western North America. Most weather fronts originate in the Pacific Ocean, and travel northeast toward the Cascade Mountains. As fronts approach, they are forced upward by the peaks of the Cascade Range (Orographic lift), causing them to drop their moisture in the form of rain or snowfall onto the Cascades. As a result, the west side of the North Cascades experiences high precipitation, especially during the winter months in the form of snowfall. Due to its temperate climate and proximity to the Pacific Ocean, areas west of the Cascade Crest very rarely experience temperatures below  or above . During winter months, weather is usually cloudy, but, due to high pressure systems over the Pacific Ocean that intensify during summer months, there is often little or no cloud cover during the summer. Because of maritime influence, snow tends to be wet and heavy, resulting in high avalanche danger.

References

External links
 Weather forecast: Unicorn Peak
 National Park Service web site: Mount Rainier National Park

Cascade Range
Mountains of Lewis County, Washington
Mountains of Washington (state)
North American 2000 m summits